The 1964 Volta a Catalunya was the 44th edition of the Volta a Catalunya cycle race and was held from 13 September to 20 September 1964. The race started in Castelldefels and finished in Barcelona. The race was won by Joseph Carrara.

General classification

References

1964
Volta
1964 in Spanish road cycling
Volta a Catalunya